10,000 Days or Ten Thousand Days may refer to:
10,000 Days (Tool album) (2006)
10,000 Days (Saga album) (2007)
Ten Thousand Days (album), a 1999 album by Bebo Norman
Ten Thousand Days (film), a 1967 Hungarian drama film by Ferenc Kósa and starring Tibor Molnár
10,000 Days (TV series), a 2010 science fiction action drama by Eric Small and starring John Schneider and Peter Wingfield
10,000 Days (film), a 2014 science fiction telefilm by Eric Small and starring John Schneider and Peter Wingfield

See also
Vietnam: The Ten Thousand Day War, a 1980 Canadian television documentary